Tawam may refer to:

Arabic 
 Tawām, also 'Tuwwam', a historical region in Eastern Arabia divided by the modern settlements of Al Ain (UAE) and Al-Buraimi (Oman)
 Tawam Roundabout, a roundabout in Al-Ain
 Tawam Hospital, a hospital in Al-Ain

Tamang 
 Tāwām; the Tamang name for the red panda (Ailurus fulgens), a mammal found in Asia